James McGrahan (3 March 1898 – after 1948), also known as Jimmy McGrahan or McGraham, was an English footballer who made 85 appearances in the Football League playing for Lincoln City (in two spells) and Wigan Borough. He played as a wing half or centre half.

Life and career
McGrahan was born in Leadgate, County Durham, and began his football career with Leadgate Park. He moved into the Football League with Lincoln City, and made his debut in the Third Division North on 26 August 1922 in a 3–1 home defeat to Halifax Town. He played 25 League matches before, with the club in financial difficulties later that same season, he and full-back Yaffer Ward left for Wigan Borough. He played 34 League matches, then, after requesting a transfer, signed for Boston Town, where he made his debut in October 1924. McGrahan returned to Lincoln City a year later, and played a further 26 League matches before joining Midland League club Scarborough as player-coach in 1927.

He was later associated with Fleetwood and Portadown football clubs, was a scout for Notts County, and coached at Fylde Rugby Club, before succeeding Fred Tunstall as manager of Boston United in 1948, a post he left the following year.

References

1898 births
Year of death missing
People from Leadgate, County Durham
Footballers from County Durham
English footballers
Association football wing halves
Leadgate Park F.C. players
Lincoln City F.C. players
Wigan Borough F.C. players
Boston Town F.C. (1920s) players
Scarborough F.C. players
English Football League players
English football managers
Boston United F.C. managers
Place of death missing